Going postal is an American English slang phrase referring to becoming extremely and uncontrollably angry, often to the point of violence, and usually in a workplace environment. The expression derives from a series of incidents from 1986 onward in which United States Postal Service (USPS) workers shot and killed managers, fellow workers, police officers and members of the general public in acts of mass murder. Between 1970 and 1997, more than 40 people were killed by then-current or former employees in at least 20 incidents of workplace rage. Between 1986 and 2011, workplace shootings happened roughly twice per year, with an average of 1.18 people killed per year.

Origin
 
The earliest known use of the phrase was on December 17, 1993, in the American newspaper the St. Petersburg Times:

On December 31, 1993, the Los Angeles Times said, "Unlike the more deadly mass shootings around the nation, which have lent a new term to the language, referring to shooting up the office as "going postal"."

Notable postal shootings

Los Angeles, California, 1970
On August 13, 1970, Alfred Kellum, 41, shot and killed postal supervisor Harry Sendrow, 54, who had sent Kellum home for being intoxicated. Five hours later, Kellum was found unconscious and was arrested. Police officers said he appeared to be intoxicated.

Edmond, Oklahoma, 1986
On August 20, 1986, during the Edmond post office shooting, postman Patrick Sherrill shot and killed 14 employees and wounded six at the Edmond, Oklahoma post office. Sherrill then killed himself with a shot to the forehead.

Escondido, California, 1989
On August 10, 1989, Escondido letter carrier John Merlin Taylor shot and killed his wife, then drove to the Orange Glen Post Office and killed two co-workers before ending the spree by shooting himself in the head.

Ridgewood, New Jersey, 1991
A former United States postal worker, Joseph M. Harris, killed his former supervisor, Carol Ott, and her boyfriend, Cornelius Kasten Jr., at their home with a katana. The following morning, on October 10, 1991, Harris shot and killed two mail handlers, Joseph M. VanderPaauw, 59, of Prospect Park, New Jersey, and Donald McNaught, 63, of Pompton Lakes, New Jersey, at the Ridgewood Post Office.

Royal Oak, Michigan, 1991

On November 14, 1991 in Royal Oak, Michigan, Thomas McIlvane killed five people, including himself, and injured five others with a rifle in Royal Oak's post office, after being fired from the Postal Service for "insubordination". He had been previously suspended for getting into altercations with postal customers on his route.

For some time before the Royal Oak incident, the service had experienced labor/management and operational problems and customer service complaints. This had drawn the attention of local media. The Office of Senator Carl Levin investigated Royal Oak, the results of which were summarized in a September 10, 1991, staff memorandum. The memorandum documented "patterns of harassment, intimidation, cruelty and allegations of favoritism in promotions and demotions ... [and] testimony relating to wide-ranging delivery and service problems" before the McIlvane shooting.

Two events in 1993
Two shootings took place on the same day, May 6, 1993, a few hours apart. At a post office in Dearborn, Michigan, Lawrence Jasion wounded three and killed one, and subsequently killed himself. In Dana Point, California, Mark Richard Hilbun killed his mother and her dog, then shot two postal workers, killing one.
As a result of these two shootings, in 1993 the  USPS created 85 Workplace Environment Analysts for domicile at its 85 postal districts. These new positions were created to help with violence prevention and workplace improvement. In February 2009, the   USPS unilaterally eliminated these positions as part of its downsizing efforts.

Goleta, California, 2006
Jennifer San Marco, a former postal employee, killed six postal employees before killing herself with a handgun, on the evening of January 30, 2006, at a large postal processing facility in Goleta, California. Police later also identified a seventh victim dead in a condominium complex in Goleta where San Marco once lived. According to media reports, the Postal Service had forced San Marco to retire in 2003 because of her worsening mental problems. The incident is believed to be the deadliest workplace shooting ever carried out in the United States by a woman.

Baker City, Oregon, 2006
Grant Gallaher, a letter carrier in Baker City, Oregon, pleaded guilty to the April 4, 2006 murder of his supervisor. He reportedly brought his .357 Magnum revolver to the city post office with the intention of killing his postmaster. When he arrived at the parking lot, he reportedly ran over his supervisor several times. He then went into the post office looking for his postmaster. Not finding him, he went back out to the parking lot and shot his supervisor. Gallaher was on a new route for three weeks and had felt pressured by a week-long work-time study and extra time added to his new route.

Dublin, Ohio, 2017
On December 23, 2017, postal worker DeShaune Stewart arrived at the Dublin Postal Office naked, then shot and killed his supervisor, Lance Hererra-Dempsey. Following the shooting, Stewart made his way to a nearby apartment complex and also killed the Dublin postmaster, Ginger Ballard, by throwing her to the ground where the blunt force trauma caused to her head killed her instantly. Stewart had been under investigation by the U.S. Postal Service prior to the incident. In September 2019, Stewart was found not guilty of his crimes by reason of insanity.

Analysis
In 1998, the United States Congress conducted a joint hearing to review the violence in the U.S. Postal Service. In the hearing, it was noted that while the postal service accounted for less than 1% of the full-time civilian labor force, 13% of workplace homicides were committed at postal facilities by current or former employees.

In 2000, researchers found that the homicide rates at postal facilities were lower than at other workplaces. In major industries, the highest rate of 2.1 homicides per 100,000 workers per year was in retail. The homicide rate for postal workers was 0.22 per 100,000 versus 0.77 per 100,000 workers in general. The common depiction of an employee returning to work for revenge on his boss is over-stated. More than half of mass workplace shootings are by current employees, and a little under a quarter are by employees who have been at their job for less than a year.

Cultural impact
In the controversial video game series Postal, the player takes on the role of an insane mass murderer in the first game, and in the later series a first-person role performing normally mundane chores (such as picking up a paycheck from work) with an often gratuitously violent twist. In 1997, the USPS sued the creators of the game, Running with Scissors, over the use of the term "postal". Running with Scissors argued that, despite its title, the game has absolutely nothing to do with the USPS or its employees. The case was dismissed with prejudice in 2003.

The 1994 comedy film Naked Gun : The Final Insult includes a scene where the main character must deal with a series of escalating threats, including the sudden appearance of dozens of disgruntled postal workers randomly firing weapons in every direction.

In the 1995 film Clueless, Cher Horowitz, played by Alicia Silverstone, frets, "I had an overwhelming sense of ickiness...like Josh thinking I was mean was making me postal."

In the 1995 fantasy film Jumanji, after the hunter Van Pelt purchases a replacement rifle at the local gun shop and then bribes the clerk into filling out the necessary legal documents for him, the clerk asks Van Pelt whether he is a postal worker.

The 2004 Discworld novel Going Postal by Terry Pratchett centers around Moist von Lipwig, a con artist and criminal, who as punishment is made the Postmaster General of Ankh-Morpork and forced to revive the Post Office. The phrase "going postal" meaning "to go mad" is used in subsequent books in reference to the events of the novel.

In the Brooklyn Nine-Nine episode USPIS, self-righteous United States Postal Inspection Service agent Jack Danger (pronounced Donger), who is passionate about his job, is adamant that "going postal" is the term most associated with bringing goodness into people's lives, which is a view shared by his co-workers, though not the NYPD Detectives.

See also
 David Berkowitz (Son of Sam), serial killer who worked for the postal service
 Fragging
 Indianapolis FedEx shooting
 List of events named massacres
 List of postal killings
 List of rampage killers (workplace killings)
 Mass shooting
 Panama City school board shootings
 Road rage
 Running amok
 School shooting
 Spree killer

References

Further reading
 Beyond Going Postal by Stephen Musacco, which examines the paramilitary, authoritarian postal culture and its relationship to toxic workplace environments and postal tragedies.
 Going Postal: Rage, Murder, and Rebellion by Mark Ames, which examines the rise of office and school shootings in the wake of the Reagan Revolution, and compares the shootings to slave rebellions
 Going Postal by Don Lasseter, which examines the issue of workplace shootings inside the USPS
 The Tainted Eagle by Charlie Withers, a union steward in the Royal Oak Post Office at the time of the shootings in Royal Oak, Michigan.
 Lone Wolf by Pan Pantziarka, a comprehensive study of the spree killer phenomenon, and looks in detail at a number of cases in the U.S., UK and Australia.
 Bob Dart, "'Going postal' is a bad rap for mail carriers, study finds", Austin American-Statesman, September 2, 2000, p. A28

External links

 Postal Work Unfairly Maligned, Study Says, September 1, 2000
 Gun advocate website listing 1986–1997 incidents
 2000 Report of the United States Postal Service Commission on a Safe and Secure Workplace (Report that called "going postal" 'a myth')
 Atlanta Journal-Constitution about the report's release
 Open Letter to the United States Congress outlining the critical need for reform of the authoritarian postal culture via Congressional intervention and legislation. (Musacco, 2009). (Chapter 11 of book Beyond Going Postal Note: In chapter 4: fallacies, omissions, and inaccurate conclusions in the 2000 Report of the United States Service Commission on a Safe and Secure Workplace were examined, especially the conclusion that "going postal was a myth, a bad rap".

Rampages
English phrases
Mass murder
Postal systems
American slang
1980s slang
1990s slang
2000s slang
American English idioms
1980s neologisms
Violence and postal systems